Rivers is an unincorporated urban community in the Riverdale Municipality within the Canadian province of Manitoba. It is within the Westman Region (Southwestern Manitoba). Agriculture, health and related businesses provide income for the community and area. Rivers has a population of 1,257 people in the 2016 census.

History 
Rivers was named in 1908 after Sir Charles Rivers Wilson, Chairman of the Board of the Grand Trunk Pacific Railway.

During the Second World War, Rivers became one of the sites in Canada which helped to fix the positions of German U-boats using high-frequency direction finding. This site, along with Portage la Prairie increased the "fix" accuracy on the U-boats. 

Rivers held town status prior to January 1, 2015. It was dissolved on that day as a result of its provincially mandated amalgamation with the Rural Municipality of Daly to form Riverdale Municipality.

Demographics 

Attractions

Infrastructure 
It was decommissioned in 1971.

Rivers is served by Provincial Trunk Highway 25 (PTH 25) and Provincial Road 250 (PR 250). PTH 25 terminates just southwest of Rivers at the unincorporated community of Wheatland, while PR 250 intersects and briefly overlaps with PTH 25.

Rivers station is a station stop for Via Rail's The Canadian.

Education
The local schools fall under the Rolling River School Division, with a nursery school, the Rivers Elementary School (kindergarten to grade 6), and Rivers Collegiate Institute (grades 7 to 12). The high school is a "Pay It Forward" school and works on programs to do just that.

In media

In The Railrodder, Buster Keaton passes through Rivers. The first chapter the 2022 Keaton biography "Buster Keaton: A Filmmaker's Life." is titled "Rivers, Manitoba".

Notable people
 Earl Dawson (1925–1987), politician and president of the Manitoba and Canadian Amateur Hockey Associations

References

External links

Former Town of Rivers official website
Rivers Banner
 Manitoba community Profiles
Map of Rivers at Statcan

Former towns in Manitoba
Populated places disestablished in 2015
2015 disestablishments in Manitoba